Manual High School is located in the Whittier neighborhood on the east side of Denver, Colorado, United States.

History
Old East High School was completed in 1889, making it the oldest high school in Denver.  It was located on Stout Street between 19th and 20th and was demolished in 1925.  Manual High School was also one of the oldest high schools in Denver, opening in 1892. The original building was located near the current one. Manual was also one of the first schools in Denver to educate African-Americans. During the 1970s and 1980s, the school had a diverse student body, a result of desegregation busing which began in 1970.

Once a model of educational excellence and community, Manual High School fell on hard times after the school district ended bussing for integration in 1995. Test scores dropped and gang-related violence troubled the school and community. Only 20% of freshman were graduating. For these reasons, the Denver Public Schools (DPS) administrators made drastic changes to Manual. In 2006, after several failed attempts to fix the problems, Manual High School was closed. When the decision was made public, several hundred students from Manual High School rallied outside the headquarters of Denver Public Schools to protest. Students were disappointed and angry because they couldn't finish the school year.

Students shouted, "Hell, no. We won't go" and "Go T-Bolts" (the school's sports moniker) as they marched for about an hour in sub-freezing temperatures outside DPS headquarters at 9th and Grant. Some students suggested that the decision to close Manual was motivated by race. In the end, the displaced students were given the option of attending other higher-performing schools. About 550 students transferred as a result to other Denver schools. The school reopened in the fall of 2007, starting with a freshman class of 150 students for the 2007–08 school year, then adding a class of students every year thereafter. A 2007 article by Katherine Boo in The New Yorker described efforts by then-superintendent of school Michael Bennet to turn Manual back into a high-performance school. By the 2010–11 school year, Manual was once again a 9–12 grade high school. Robert Stein, a Manual graduate (Class of 1977) and top school leader in Colorado, was tapped to lead the new Manual High School in 2007. Leaving his job at the private Graland Country Day School, Stein created a new program for Manual, modeled after high-performing charter schools where students' performance data is scrutinized and students must follow clear guidelines for behavior. This program was a success for the first three years, and helped Manual to post the third-highest growth in test scores in the city and top the district as its highest performed Title I high school. However, after three years, Stein left the school in 2010 due to frustrations with a disagreeing supervisor and bureaucracy issues, especially regarding autonomy and funding.

Joe Sandoval led the school for the 2010–11 school year, until administrators of DPS could find a principal for the school. For the 2011–12 school year, the principal selection committee chose Brian Dale, former principal of Bruce Randolph, to lead the school. Dale was asked to leave Manual High School in 2014, after a dramatic drop in test scores and overspending on the experiential learning program model that was implemented. Don Roy took his place as the interim principal while a new one was selected through an intensive process informed, in part, by the Thought Partner Group, a committee of Manual alumni, community members, parents, and stakeholders. The result of this process was the selection of Nick Dawkins to lead the school starting in the fall of 2015. Dawkins is a native of the community, a DPS graduate, and a high achieving career-DPS educator.

Manual High School graduated its first senior class in 2011 since re-opening. With Manual's graduating class of 2011 the school showed renewed preparation for making students college-bound. Manual High School has made a commitment to leave no T-Bolt behind and to do "whatever it takes to ensure that students stay in school and are prepared for success in college, career and in life." However, by 2014, problems were apparent.

Student body
53.1% Latino
40.6% African American
5.6% Caucasian
0.3% Native American
0.3%

In 2014, Manual High School had about 500 students, 60 percent of whom were Latino and 30 percent of whom were African-American.

Academics

Many academic offerings are available at Manual High School, and concurrent college coursework is also available to some students.

Athletics

Manual High School's athletic teams are known as the Thunderbolts (or T-bolts). The school's crest has two thunderbolts in it.

Other extracurricular activities

A magazine, BOOM!, has been produced at the high school, beginning in 2008, and distributed in the school and in other select locations in the community.

Notable alumni

Listed alphabetically by surname
 Helen Marie Black, first female manager of an American symphony orchestra 
 Walt Conley, folk singer, musician and actor 
 Ted Conover, writer 
 Larry Farmer, American basketball coach and former player UCLA 
 Steve Gibson, member of Tag Team, hip-hop duo
 DC Glenn, member of Tag Team, hip-hop duo
 Rodolfo "Corky" Gonzales, boxer, poet, and activist 
 Michael B. Hancock, Mayor of Denver 
 Scott Horsley, journalist, National Public Radio correspondent
Ron Kellum, producer/director, artist and Broadway veteran. Kellum was a contestant on Season 17 of the award-winning television series The Amazing Race. 
 Norman Rice, the first black mayor of Seattle
 Micheal Ray Richardson, basketball player and coach
 Roger Wolcott Toll, mountaineer and former superintendent of Mount Rainier, Rocky Mountains, and Yellowstone National Park
 Wellington Webb, first black Mayor of Denver

Notes

External links
 Official website

Educational institutions established in 2007
Public high schools in Colorado
High schools in Denver
2007 establishments in Colorado